Mary Priscilla Avery Sawtelle (April 30, 1835 – April 22, 1894) was an American early Oregon doctor and rights champion.

Life
Sawtelle was born in New York City in 1835. Her father Benjamin was a Methodist minister. After her father died, she moved with her mother and step-father to Marion County in 1848. She married Carsena A. Huntley when she was 14 in order that her new husband could make a land claim in her name of an additional 320 acres of land in Oregon. Permission was conditionally given by her mother Priscilla and her new husband John Stipp who was also a minister. The condition was that Huntley, who was 21 years older than her, agreed that they would not live together till she was 17 and that their first child would be when she was 25. They were soon living together however and Sawtelle had her first child at the age of 15. Before she was 25, she had three children and an abusive husband. She successfully filed for divorce, but the judge awarded the custody of their children to Carsena Huntley.

In 1861 she remarried Cheston M. Sawtelle who she had met whilst studying at the Willamette Institute. They both started teaching and in time they had three children. In 1869 she was first woman studying medicine at Willamette. Her cause was taken up women's rights supporters including newspaper editor Abigail Scott Duniway and with their support she attended the homeopathic New York Medical College and Hospital for Women. She graduated in 1872 and meanwhile Duniway was to appear at Oregon's State House to put forward the case for women's suffrage. She was appearing on behalf of the Oregon State Woman Suffrage Association but no one wanted to keep her company. Other women feared what their husband's and others might say, so it was Sawtelle who accompanied Duniway.

Sawtelle died in New York City in 1894 after an operation.

References

1835 births
1894 deaths
Physicians from New York City
American women physicians
Physicians from Oregon
People from Marion County, Oregon
Willamette University alumni